This is a list of Polish exonyms for cities, towns, municipalities, islands, rivers, etc. located in Germany. Names officially used now are written in bold. Note that due to the complex Polish-German history, several listed named have been in actual use as native names, and are thus NOT exonyms.

Cities, towns and municipalities

Aachen Akwizgran
Ahlbeck Przyjezierze
Altwarp Stare Warpno
Angermünde Dobrzyniec
Anklam Nakło nad Pianą
Bad Freienwalde Tarnowica
Bad Muskau Mużaków
Bansin Badzyń Morski
Barth Bardo
Bautzen Budziszyn
Beeskow Bezków
Benz Benice
Berlin Berolin, Braliń
Bernstadt auf dem Eigen Biernacice
Binz Bińce
Bischofswerda Biskupice
Braunschweig Brunszwik
Bremen Brema
Briesen (Mark) Brzezin
Brieskow Wrzesko
Britz Brzózki
Brüssow Boryszewo
Buckow Buków
Bugewitz Boguszewice
Burg (Spreewald) Borkowy
Calau Kaława
Carmzow Karniszów
Chemnitz Kamienica Saska
Cottbus Chociebuż

Demmin Dymin
Dessau Dessawa
Doberlug Dobry Łuk
Döbern Debrzno
Drebkau Drzewków
Drehnow Drzonów
Dresden Drezno
Ducherow Tchórzów
Eggesin Kcynia
Eisenhüttenstadt Żelazowa Huta
Falkenberg Poradz
Falkenhagen Rokowo
Finsterwalde Grabin
Forst (Lausitz) Barść
Freiburg Fryburg Bryzgowijski
Freising Fryzynga
Fürstenwalde Przybór
Gartz Gardziec Odrzański
Garz Gardziec Rugijski
Golzow Golczów
Göhren Górzno
Görlitz Zgorzelec
Göttingen Getynga
Gramzow Gręzowo
Greifswald Gryfia
Großenhain Osiek Wielki
Guben Gubin
Gützkow Choćków
Hannover Hanower
Hanshagen Januszów
Heringsdorf Cieszęcin
Herrnhut Ochranów
Hintersee Zajezierze
Hohenfinow Winawa Górna
Hohenselchow Zelechowo Górne
Hoyerswerda Wojrowice
Jacobsdorf Wadochowice
Jatznick Jasiennik
Kamenz Kamieniec
Kemnitz Kamienica
Kiel Kilonia
Koblenz Koblencja
Konstanz Konstancja
Korswandt Kurozwęcz
Koserow Kosarzewo
Königsbrück Kinsbork
Krackow Kraków
Kröslin Chroślin
Krugsdorf Świechcin
Krummin Kromnin
Köln Kolonia
Lassan Lesiany
Lebus Lubusz
Leipzig Lipsk
Letschin Lucin
Lieberose Luboradz
Liepe Lipa
Liepgarten Lipia Góra
Lietzen Leśnica
Lohme Łom
Löbau Lubiniec/Lubij
Löcknitz Łęknica
Löwitz Łowicz
Lubmin Lubomin
Luckau Łuków
Lunow Łunów
Lübeck Lubeka
Lübben (Spreewald) Lubin
Lübbenau Lubniów
Mainz Moguncja
Meißen Miśnia
Mescherin Moskorzyn
Müllrose Miłoradz
Müncheberg Lubiąż
München Monachium
Murchin Mrochyń
Nadrensee Nadręże
Neubrandenburg Branibór Nowy
Neuhardenberg Kwilica
Neulewin Łowinek
Neustadt in Sachsen Nowe Miasto
Neustrelitz Strzelce Nowe
Neutrebbin Trzebin
Neuzelle Sławin
Niederfinow Winawa Dolna
Niesky Niska
Nürnberg Norymberga
Oderberg Odrzycko
Pasewalk Pozdawilk
Passau Pasawa
Passow Parsów
Peenemünde Pianoujście
Peitz Picń/Pieczyn
Penkun Pieńkuń
Pinnow Pniów
Podelzig Podolsk
Potsdam Poczdam
Prenzlau Przęsław
Pulsnitz Połcznica
Putzar Pożar
Quedlinburg Kwedlinburg
Querfurt Kwerfurt
Regensburg Ratyzbona
Rankwitz Rankowice
Reitwein Rytwiany
Rochlitz Rochelice
Rostock Roztoka
Rothenburg, Oberlausitz Rozbork
Rubkow Robaków
Ruhland Rolany
Sassnitz Sośnica
Schirgiswalde Zerachów
Schleswig Szlezwik
Schwedt Świecie Odrzańskie
Schwerin Zwierzyn
Sellin Zieleń
Senftenberg Komorów Zły
Seelow Zelów
Sonnewalde Grodziszcze
Spandau Spandawa
Speyer Spira
Spremberg Gródek
Stolpe an der Peene Słup
Stolpe auf Usedom Słup
Stolpen Słupno
Storkow Starków
Stralsund Strzałów
Strasburg Strażno
Tantow Tętowa
Templin Tęplin
Thiessow Cisów
Torgelow Stare Turzegłowy
Treplin Trzepielin
Trier Trewir
Tübingen Tybinga
Ueckermünde Wkryujście
Usedom Uznam
Vetschau Wietoszów
Viereck Krzewiec
Vierraden Koła
Warsin Warszyn
Wallmow Wolimów
Weißenberg Białogóra
Weißwasser Biała Woda
Wettin Wettyn
Wiesenau Sucha Grobla
Wismar Wyszomierz
Wittenberg Wittenberga
Wolgast Wołogoszcz
Worms Wormacja
Wriezen Wrzecień
Wusterhusen Ostrożno
Zechin Czechyn
Zeitz Życz
Zemitz Siemice
Zempin Czempin
Zerrenthin Czarnocino
Zichow Cichów
Ziethen Sitno
Ziltendorf Sułocin
Zinnowitz Cis
Zirchow Sierchów
Zittau Żytawa
Zwickau Ćwików

Natural locations
Donau Dunaj (river)
Elbe Łaba (river)
Fränkische Saale Soława Frankońska (river)
Greifswalder Oie Święty Ostrów (island)
Havel Hawela (river)
Isar Izara (river)
Jasmund Jasmat (peninsula)
Main Men (river)
Mönchgut Mnichów (peninsula)
Mosel Mozela (river)
Mulde Mulda (river)
Nordfriesischen Inseln Wyspy Północnofryzyjskie
Ostfriesische Inseln Wyspy Wschodniofryzyjskie
Peene Piana (river)
Putzarer See Jezioro Pożar (lake)
Rhein Ren (river)
Riether Werder Ostrów (island)
Roter Main Czerwony Men (river)
Ruden Rudno (island)
Rügen Rugia (island)
Ruhr Ruhra (river)
Saale Soława (river)
Saar Saara (river)
Schwarze Elster Czarna Elstera (river)
Spree Sprewa (river)
Uecker Wkra (river)
Unstrut Unstruta (river)
Vilm Ilmo (island)
Weiße Elster Biała Elstera (river)
Weißer Main Biały Men (river)
Weser Wezera (river)

See also
List of European exonyms
List of German exonyms for places in Poland

References

Polish language
Polish
Exonyms for places in Germany
Polish exonyms in Germany
Polish